The 2000–01 Pittsburgh Panthers men's basketball team represented the University of Pittsburgh in the 2000–01 NCAA Division I men's basketball season. Led by head coach Ben Howland, the Panthers finished with a record of 19–14. They were invited to the 2001 National Invitation Tournament where they lost in the second round to Mississippi State.

References

Pittsburgh Panthers men's basketball seasons
Pittsburgh
Pittsburgh Pan
Pittsburgh Pan